Florishchi is a rural locality (a selo) in Florishchinskoye Rural Settlement, Kolchuginsky District, Vladimir Oblast, Russia. The population was 226 in 2010. There are eight streets.

Geography 
Florishchi is located 19 km west of Kolchugino (the district's administrative centre) by road. Dyakonovo is the nearest rural locality.

References 

Rural localities in Kolchuginsky District